"The Joker's Millions" is a comic book storyline featuring the character Joker, published in Detective Comics #180 (February 1952). In the story, the Joker decides to retire from crime after inheriting a massive fortune, only to find out too late that he has fallen victim to an elaborate scheme to humiliate him.

Publication history 
"The Joker's Millions" was published in Detective Comics #180 (Feb. 1952). As with all early Batman comics at the time, Bob Kane is the only person credited for the comic, but the story itself was written by "David Vern" (a.k.a. David V. Reed).

Plot
At the funeral of "King" Barlowe, a criminal racketeer and a major rival of the Joker, the Joker is surprised to learn that he has inherited Barlowe's vast fortune. With his newfound fortune, the Joker builds himself a life of luxury and retires from crime. The Joker spends his money freely, thinking that he still has plenty of it left, only to discover that Barlowe has had the last laugh after all from beyond the grave - the money is all counterfeit. He then receives a visit from the IRS, which has assessed an inheritance tax based on the total amount of the supposed fortune.

The Joker is torn between reporting the inheritance as counterfeit in order to avoid the tax liability (thus becoming a laughing stock in the Gotham City underworld for admitting that Barlowe had tricked him), going to jail for tax evasion, or returning to crime in order to pay the inheritance tax, rebuild his fortune, and protect his reputation. The Joker chooses the third option, yet he decides to commit normal, "un-Jokerish" crimes as secretly as possible and without his usual calling card flourishes, figuring that no one would ever suspect him of such pedestrian affairs. First he breaks into a bank safe, but "fate's invisible hand plays strange tricks" as the wind blows a movie theater's banner onto the bank that the Joker just robbed, making it look like a Joker crime. After discovering that the Joker's money is counterfeit, Batman and Robin have to prove that the Joker is actually committing these crimes.

When the Joker performs a stick-up at the Gotham Opera House dressed in a trenchcoat and slouch hat, Batman is able to guess that the Joker was behind it and burns the theater's tickets to I Pagliacci to make it, too, look like a Joker crime. A similar deduction occurs after the Joker tries robbing the Gotham Zoo. Batman locks himself in the zoo's bat cage to make it look like a joke that was performed on him by the Joker. The Joker, jumping at the chance to satisfy his massive ego, claims to an underworld friend that he had robbed the zoo for the sole purpose of humiliating Batman. However, the underworld friend was actually Batman in disguise, and with a recording of the Joker's confession that Batman made, the Joker is promptly arrested.

Collected editions
As well as appearing in Detective Comics #180, the story has been reprinted in a trade paperback:

Batman: The Complete History (paperback, 1999, Chronicle Books )

In other media
"The Joker's Millions" was adapted for an episode of The New Batman Adventures animated television series, which aired in November 1997. The episode remains mostly faithful to the original story while updating or changing certain aspects, such as the use of series original character Harley Quinn and Batgirl taking Robin's place in the story as he had become Nightwing at that point in the series. Additionally, the Joker learns of Edward "King" Barlowe's deception via a video tape and attempts to have one of his men impersonate him to distract Batman from what happened. However, Batman exposes the imposter and the Joker is eventually captured and sent to Arkham Asylum, where Harley takes revenge on him for replacing her.

References

External links
 

Joker (character) titles